Death's Dynamic Shroud (also known as death's dynamic shroud.wmv under specific releases) is an American electronic and vaporwave trio consisting of James Webster, Tech Honors, and Keith Rankin. The band releases a large amount of music regularly as sample-driven mixtapes under the .wmv moniker, in addition to releasing more standard mainline albums. 

The band's inception is regarded to have been in 2013, following the addition of Keith Rankin. However, James Webster and Tech Honors had been creating music together and independently, for several years prior. In 2017, with the release of their album Heavy Black Heart, the group used the name, 'death's dynamic shroud' for mainline albums, and 'death's dynamic shroud.wmv' for their NUWRLD mixtape series.

History 
During the 2000s and early 2010s (pre-2013), Webster, Honors, and Rankin were active within the Dayton, Ohio music scene. Since their teens, Honors and Webster played together in the space rock band, The Sailing, with Honors on vocals and keyboard, and Webster on vocals and guitar. 

In early 2011, Rankin founded Orange Milk Records with Seth Graham. During the same time period and through 2013, Honors, Webster, along with other collaborators such as Rankin, and The Sailing bandmate Michael Kirkland took turns writing and publishing a song a day to Soundcloud under the pseudonym Rebecca Peake. Honors and Webster would later release albums compiling tracks from each month through Bandcamp, three of which were given official cassette releases via Squids Eye Tapes. Certain songs from the project would later be re-released or rearranged by the collaborators under different aliases.

In 2012, Honors and Webster founded Ghost Diamond as a way to pool their collaborative work. The band members would continue to release more works under various labels and aliases, both as groups and individuals, and would lead to interest in vaporwave.

Early 2014 would see the release of the first project under the death's dynamic shroud.wmv name, シェンムーONLINE, which heavily samples the Shenmue soundtrack and was produced by Webster alone. This would start a series of vaporwave mixtapes produced individually by Honors and Webster, known as the NUWRLD Mixtapes.   

In 2015, the album I'll Try Living Like This, was released digital and CD-R. Unlike previous Death's Dynamic Shroud albums by Rankin or Webster, I'll Try Living Like This was not produced using the Portastudio, in order to compliment the CD-R release. It was ranked #15 out of 50 on FACT Magazine's Top 50 Best Albums of 2015.

Modern Conception 

In 2017 they released Heavy Black Heart under Orange Milk Records, and marked the group's first album with all three members working together. It also marked a slight departure from vaporwaves' typically lo-fi production while still retaining its sample-heavy roots. The band regards the release as an inflection point that defined their creative structure, and saw more standardization of release names and collaborations.

In late 2020 the NUWRLD Mixtape Club, a Bandcamp subscription service which allowed members access to exclusive death's dynamic shroud mixtapes on a monthly basis was opened to the public. For the first year of the mixtape club, mixtapes were produced by Honors and Webster, alternating each month. Rankin would release his first mixtape for the club, Faith In Persona on November 1st, 2021 to favorable reviews and marked a turning point in the group's visibility. It would be released on Spotify and Apple Music a month later.

In early 2022 the band announced a new mainline album titled Darklife, again featuring contributions from all three members, which was later released in September to positive reviews. The album was praised for being ambitious and unlike most contemporary electronic music releases.

Discography

NUWRLD Mixtapes (2014)

Mainline albums (2014–present)

Live albums

Singles 
 "Judgment Bolt" (2022)
 "Neon Memories" (2022)
 "Messe de E-102" (2022)
 "Fall for Me" (2022)

NUWRLD Mixtape Club releases (2020–present)

References

External links 
 

American electronic music groups
Vaporwave musicians